Norman Rogers may refer to:

The real name of DJ Terminator X
Norman McLeod Rogers, member of the Cabinet of Canadian Prime Minister William Lyon Mackenzie King
Norm Rogers (Australian rules footballer), East Fremantle defender
Norm Rogers (rugby league), Eastern Suburbs centre